Campbell Bay National Park is a national park in India, located on the island of Great Nicobar, the largest of the Nicobar Islands in the eastern Indian Ocean some 190 km to the north of Sumatra. It was gazetted as a national park of India in 1992, and forms part of the Great Nicobar Biosphere Reserve. The park has an approximate area of some 426 km2, and is separated from the smaller Galathea National Park by a 12-km wide forest buffer zone. The climate is humid and warm.

History 
It was designated in 1992.

See also
 Andaman and Nicobar Environmental Team
 Society for Andaman and Nicobar Ecology

References 

National parks in the Andaman and Nicobar Islands
Protected areas established in 1992
1992 establishments in the Andaman and Nicobar Islands